Gideon Olin Whittemore (August 12, 1800 – June 30, 1863) was an American lawyer and politician.

Whittemore was born in St. Albans, Vermont on August 12, 1800, studied law, and was admitted to the bar. He began practicing law in Pontiac, Michigan, and was a judge in Oakland County. He was appointed to the Board of Regents of the University of Michigan from 1837 to 1840, served as Michigan Secretary of State from 1846 to 1848, and later entered the lumber business.

He died on June 30, 1863, in Tawas City, Michigan.

References 

1800 births
1863 deaths
Regents of the University of Michigan
Michigan lawyers
Secretaries of State of Michigan
People from Franklin County, Vermont
People from Pontiac, Michigan
19th-century American judges
19th-century American lawyers
19th-century American politicians